"Steppin' On" is a song by Australian group Sexing the Cherry, originally featured on the 1992 compilation album High (A Dance Compilation). The song was first released as a single in 1993, before being re-released as "Steppin' On Remix" in 1994, after which it peaked at number 42 on the ARIA Charts. It was also included on the Heartbreak High soundtrack.

Critical reception
In 2022, The Music reviewed the song, writing: "Brisbane isn't long remembered for its contribution to the 90s dance scene, but Sexing the Cherry tried to turn that around with this dance-floor banger that peaked just outside the top 40. Bit of saxophone. Big soaring chorus. What wasn't to like? Check out the high note at 3:10."

Track listings
"Steppin' On Remix" CD maxi
 "Steppin' On" (Radio edit) – 4:03
 "Steppin' On" (Keepin' On mix) – 10:05
 "Steppin' On" (Dubin' On mix)	– 8:19
 "Steppin' On" (Don't Stop the Music mix) – 9:49
 "Steppin' On" (Don't Stop the Sax mix) – 7:48

Charts

References

1992 songs
1993 singles
1994 singles